Lac de Goria is a lake in Corsica, France. At an elevation of 1852 m, its surface area is 0.04 km².

References

Lakes of Haute-Corse
Goria